Lieutenant Colonel Adrian Grant Duff, C.B. (29 September 1869 – 14 September 1914), was a British officer and administrator. He was responsible for creating the "War Book", the British Army's plan to deploy to the European continent, and commanded the 1st Battalion the Black Watch (Royal Highlanders) during the opening months of World War I.

Life
Born in London on 29 September 1869, he was the third son of Mountstuart Elphinstone Grant Duff and his wife Anna Julia Webster. He was educated at Wellington College and the Royal Military College (Sandhurst), commissioning into the 2nd Battalion the Black Watch in 1889.

Grant Duff served in peacetime roles around the British Empire. He rejected a plan to transfer to the British South Africa Police, based on advice from Robert Henry Meade. He saw action during the Tirah Campaign and the Second Anglo-Boer War, before being seconded to the War Office in 1905 as staff captain. He became Assistant Secretary to the Committee of Imperial Defence there in 1910.

At the War Office Grant Duff wrote Coordination of Departmental Action on the Occurrence of Strained Relations and on the Outbreak of War, commonly known as the "War Book", which highlighted flaws in the British Government's preparations for a European War, and formed the basis for the British Expeditionary Force's plan to deploy to France and Belgium in 1914. He was much more impressed with the naval officer George Alexander Ballard than his superior Ernest Troubridge of the War Staff. Grant Duff was conservative, and held a low opinion of politicians in general, and the government handling of the Curragh incident in particular, as political interference in a military matter.

In 1913 Grant Duff returned to the 1st Battalion the Black Watch and commanded the battalion in France and Belgium throughout the Retreat from Mons and the Battle of the Marne, before being killed in action at the Battle of the Aisne on 14 September 1914. He was buried in Moulins.

Family
Grant Duff married in 1906 Ursula Lubbock (born 1885), daughter of John Lubbock, 1st Baron Avebury. They had a son and three daughters.

References

External links 

 The papers of Adrian Grant Duff held at Churchill Archives Centre

1869 births
1914 deaths
Black Watch officers
British military personnel of the Tirah campaign
British Army personnel of the Second Boer War
British Army personnel of World War I
British military personnel killed in World War I